The 1980 United States presidential election in Delaware took place on November 4, 1980. All 50 states and The District of Columbia, were part of the 1980 United States presidential election. State voters chose three electors to the Electoral College, who voted for president and vice president.

The election here was close, with Delaware being won by former California Governor Ronald Reagan by two points. Notably, Reagan won New Castle County by just one vote over Carter.

See also
 United States presidential elections in Delaware

References

Delaware
1980
1980 Delaware elections